Ancient Greek philosophy differentiates main conceptual forms and distinct words for the Modern English word love: agápē, érōs, philía, philautía, storgē, and xenía.

List of concepts
Though there are more Greek words for love, variants and possibly subcategories, a general summary considering these Ancient Greek concepts is as follows:

 Agápe means "love: esp. brotherly love, charity; the love of God for person and of person for God". Agape is used in ancient texts to denote feelings for one's children and the feelings for a spouse, and it was also used to refer to a love feast. Agape is used by Christians to express the unconditional love of God for His children. This type of love was further explained by Thomas Aquinas as "to will the good of another".
 Éros means "love, mostly of the sexual passion". The Modern Greek word "erotas" means "intimate love". Plato refined his own definition: Although eros is initially felt for a person, with contemplation it becomes an appreciation of the beauty within that person, or even becomes appreciation of beauty itself. Plato does not talk of physical attraction as a necessary part of love, hence the use of the word platonic to mean "without physical attraction". In the Symposium, an ancient work on the subject, Plato has Socrates argue that eros helps the soul recall knowledge of beauty and contributes to an understanding of spiritual truth, the ideal form of youthful beauty that leads us humans to feel erotic desire – thus suggesting that even that sensually based love aspires to the non-corporeal, spiritual plane of existence; that is, finding its truth, just like finding any truth, leads to transcendence. Lovers and philosophers are all inspired to seek truth through the means of eros.
 Philia means "affectionate regard, friendship", usually "between equals". It is a dispassionate virtuous love, a concept developed by Aristotle. In his best-known work on ethics, Nicomachean Ethics, philia is expressed variously as loyalty to friends (specifically, "brotherly love"), family, and community, and requires virtue, equality, and familiarity. Furthermore, in the same text philos is also the root of philautia denoting self-love and arising from it, a general type of love, used for love between family, between friends, a desire or enjoyment of an activity, as well as between lovers. 
 Storge means "love, affection" and "especially of parents and children". It is the common or natural empathy, like that felt by parents for offspring. Rarely used in ancient works, and then almost exclusively as a descriptor of relationships within the family. It is also known to express mere acceptance or putting up with situations, as in "loving" the tyrant. This is also used when referencing the love for one's country or a favorite sports team.
 Philautia means "self-love". To love oneself or "regard for one's own happiness or advantage" has been conceptualized both as a basic human necessity and as a moral flaw, akin to vanity and selfishness, synonymous with amour-propre or egotism. The Greeks further divided this love into positive and negative: one, the unhealthy version, is the self-obsessed love, and the other is the concept of self-compassion.
 Xenia is an ancient Greek concept of hospitality. It is sometimes translated as "guest-friendship" or "ritualized friendship". It is an institutionalized relationship rooted in generosity, gift exchange, and reciprocity. Historically, hospitality towards foreigners and guests (Hellenes not of your polis) was understood as a moral obligation. Hospitality towards foreign Hellenes honored Zeus Xenios (and Athene Xenia) patrons of foreigners.

See also 

Color wheel theory of love 
Diotima of Mantinea
The Four Loves by C. S. Lewis
Greek love
Intellectual virtue – Greek words for knowledge
 Love
Restoration of Peter
Sapphic love

References

Sources
 
 

Love
Love
Love